Imbalu is a public circumcision ceremony practiced by the Bamasaba people of Uganda. It takes place at the Mutoto cultural site (also called Mutoto cultural ground) near Mbale in eastern Uganda. It is mostly active in the 8th month of every even year. The ground is believed to be the place where the first Mugishu (Mumasaba) was circumcised. This community affair is characterized by dance and food. The ceremony has been heavily promoted as a tourist attraction, and tens of thousands of people attend.

References

Further reading 
 
 

Circumcision
Events in Uganda